Arginae is a subfamily of argid sawflies in the family Argidae. There are about 12 genera and more than 400 described species in Arginae.

Genera
These 12 genera belong to the subfamily Arginae:

 Antargidium Morice, 1919
 Arge Schrank, 1802
 Asiarge Gussakovskii, 1935
 Brevisceniana Wei, 2005
 Kokujewia Konow, 1902
 Pseudarge
 Scobina Lepeletier & Serville, 1828
 Sjoestedtia Konow, 1907
 Spinarge Wei, 1998
 Triarge
 Zhuhongfuna
 † Mioarge Nel, 2004

References

External links

Argidae